Mettunasuvanpalayam or M. N. Palayam is a Census Town in the Erode taluk of Erode district in the south Indian state of Tamil Nadu.

Demographics 
 census, Mettunasuvanpalayam Census Town had a total population of 17,240 with 8638 males and 8602 females. Out of the total population 1574 are under 6 years of age. Mettunasuvanpalayam has a literacy rate of 84.87% which is higher than Tamil Nadu average. This census town is a part of Erode Urban Agglomeration.

Developments
The population of the census town is increasing due its presence along the northern periphery of Erode city. The National Highway NH 544 connecting Salem with Kochi pass through Lakshmi Nagar of this area. In 2016, Erode Municipal Corporation council declared a resolution to merge Mettunasuvanpalayam with Erode Corporation jurisdiction.

References

Cities and towns in Erode district